Fabrizio Lasagna (born 26 June 1988) is an Italian professional footballer who plays as a forward.

On 14 July 2011, he joined Avellino in a definitive deal.

Caps on Italian Series 

Serie C1 : 50 caps, 5 goal

Serie C2 : 24 caps, 3 goal

Total : 74 caps, 8 goal

References

External links

Living people
1988 births
U.S. Vibonese Calcio players
Association football forwards
Italian footballers
Paganese Calcio 1926 players
U.S. Avellino 1912 players